Yondé is a department or commune of Koulpélogo Province in eastern Burkina Faso. Its capital lies at the town of Yondé. According to the 1996 census the department has a total population of 25,261.

Towns and villages
 Yondé (2 884 inhabitants) (capital)
 Baoghin (878 inhabitants) 
 Boussirabogo (2 835 inhabitants) 
 Dabogo (1 374 inhabitants) 
 Dazinre (233 inhabitants) 
 Foulbado-Mossi (408 inhabitants) 
 Gnanghin (965 inhabitants) 
 Gnogzinse (647 inhabitants) 
 Kamseogo (1 250 inhabitants) 
 Kamseogo-Feulh (97 inhabitants) 
 Kidibi (958 inhabitants) 
 Koadiga (585 inhabitants) 
 Kondogo (1 123 inhabitants) 
 Loume (871 inhabitants) 
 Napenga (745 inhabitants) 
 Nobsgogo (83 inhabitants) 
 Niorgo-Yanga (770 inhabitants) 
 Pogoyoaga (1 057 inhabitants) 
 Salembaore (4 370 inhabitants) 
 Welguemsibou (873 inhabitants) 
 Wobgo (643 inhabitants) 
 Yactibo (1 040 inhabitants) 
 Yonde-Peulh (181 inhabitants) 
 Yorghin (391 inhabitants)

References

Departments of Burkina Faso
Koulpélogo Province